Grégoire Barrère and Tristan Lamasine were the defending champions but only Lamasine chose to defend his title, partnering Hugo Nys. Lamasine lost in the quarterfinals to Gero Kretschmer and Alexander Satschko.

Sander Gillé and Joran Vliegen won the title after defeating Kretschmer and Satschko 6–7(2–7), 7–6(7–2), [14–12] in the final.

Seeds

Draw

References
 Main Draw

Open Sopra Steria de Lyon - Doubles
2017 Doubles
2017 in French tennis